Mohammad Yusuf Siddiq (born 1957) is a Bangladeshi epigraphist, historian, environmental researcher, professor and author. His work mainly focuses on inscriptions pertaining to the Sultanate period of historic Bengal. Siddiq is the president of the Bangladesh Association for Needy People's Improvement.

Early life and family
Siddiq was born in 1957 to a Bengali Muslim parents, Mohammad Mujibur Rahman and Bilqis Begum, from the village of Dadanchak in the Nawabganj District of East Pakistan (now Bangladesh). His father was a professor and historian. Siddiq's family had migrated from Gopalganj village near Sujnipara, Murshidabad (present-day West Bengal). They are Mandals with Khorasani ancestry. His lineage is as follows: Mohammad Yusuf Siddiq ibn Mujibur Rahman ibn Abdul Ghani ibn Ayyub Husayn ibn Haji Shahadat Mandal ibn Bulaqi Mandal ibn Nizamuddin Mandal ibn Abdul Karim Mandal ibn Haydar Ali Khan.

Academic education and career
Siddiq is fluent in 10 languages. He obtained his degree from Umm al-Qura University in Mecca, Saudi Arabia.

Siddiq became an associate professor of Islamic studies at Islamic University, Bangladesh. Between 1991 and 1992, he was a visiting fellow at the Oxford Centre for Islamic Studies. Siddiq was then offered various positions at Harvard University, serving from 1987 to 1994 and 1996 to 1998. He served as a research fellow at the Aga Khan Program for Islamic Architecture and Massachusetts Institute of Technology. He later became a faculty member of Islamic history and civilisation at the University of Sharjah in the United Arab Emirates. Between 1998 and 2001, he served as the founding chairman of the Department of Arabic and Islamic Studies at Zayed University.

Siddiq was a Higher Education Commission professor of Islamic History, Civilization and culture at the Faculty of Islamic Studies, University of the Punjab in Lahore. In 2011, he became a professor of Arabic in the Gurmani Centre for Languages and Literature at the Lahore University of Management Sciences. In 2013, he was awarded an honorary fellowship at the International Centre for Study of Bengal Art. He has written many articles for the Encyclopaedia of Islam, Muqarnas, Bulletin of the School of Oriental & African Studies, Journal of the Asiatic Society of Bangladesh and Journal of Islamic Studies (Oxford). Siddiq was a member of the executive council of the International Society of Bengal Studies from 2018 to 2020.

Works
Siddiq is a specialist in Islamic epigraphy – particularly from the Sultanate of Bengal. His book, Epigraphy and Islamic Culture, is considered an important reference in the history of Islamic inscriptions in the region.

Arabic

English

Bengali

Indonesian

References

External links
 Bengali book launch

1957 births
People from Chapai Nawabganj district
Bangladeshi people of Turkic descent
Bengali writers
English-language writers from Bangladesh
21st-century Bangladeshi male writers
Bangladeshi Arabic writers
Umm al-Qura University alumni
Academic staff of the Islamic University, Bangladesh
Academic staff of the University of the Punjab
Academic staff of Zayed University
Academic staff of Lahore University of Management Sciences
Academics of the Oxford Centre for Islamic Studies
Academic staff of the University of Sharjah
Historians of Islam
21st-century Bengalis
21st-century Bangladeshi historians
Living people